Brandon Tyree Rachal (born September 30, 1999) is an American professional basketball player who last played for the Long Island Nets of the NBA G League. He played college basketball for the LSU Tigers, the Pearl River CC Wildcats, and the Tulsa Golden Hurricane.

High school career
Rachal played basketball for Natchitoches Central High School in his hometown of Natchitoches, Louisiana. He helped his team win two state titles with one runner-up finish. In his junior season, Rachal averaged 15 points, eight rebounds and three steals per game. He led his team to a Class 5A state championship and was named MVP of the title game. As a senior, he averaged 20 points, 12 rebounds and three steals per game. A four-star recruit, Rachal committed to playing college basketball for LSU over offers from Texas and Texas A&M, among others. He reaffirmed his commitment to LSU after head coach Johnny Jones was replaced by Will Wade. Rachal also played football at the wide receiver position in high school and was recruited by college football programs.

College career
On January 29, 2018, Rachal was suspended for one game by LSU for violating team rules. He was suspended for LSU's two games at the National Invitational Tournament for undisclosed reasons. As a freshman, Rachal averaged 4.4 points and 3.3 rebounds per game. For his sophomore season, he moved to Pearl River Community College. Rachal averaged 15.5 points, 8.7 rebounds and 2.7 assists per game, earning Second Team National Junior College Athletic Association All-American honors. For his junior season, he transferred to Tulsa. On November 16, 2019, he recorded a career-high 30 points, seven rebounds and five steals in a 72–65 victory against Austin Peay. As a junior, Rachal averaged 12.1 points and 5.8 rebounds per game, and was named to the Third Team All-American Athletic Conference (AAC). On January 2, 2021, he posted a senior season-high 25 points and 13 rebounds in a 70–66 win over Cincinnati. Rachal was named Naismith Player of the Week on January 4. As a senior, he averaged 15 points, 7.2 rebounds and 2.2 assists per game, and was a Second Team All-AAC selection.

Professional career
After going undrafted in the 2021 NBA draft, Rachal joined the Brooklyn Nets for 2021 NBA Summer League. On October 11, 2021, Rachal signed with the Nets. He was waived at the end of training camp on October 15. On October 25, 2021, Rachal joined the Long Island Nets.

Rachal again signed with the Brooklyn Nets on October 1, 2022, but was waived on October 5. He rejoined Long Island on October 9. On January 23, 2023, Rachal was waived after appearing in 1 game. He was acquired by the Fort Wayne Mad Ants from waivers, on February 27. He was waived on March 8 without appearing in a game.

Career statistics

College

NCAA Division I

|-
| style="text-align:left;"|2017–18
| style="text-align:left;"|LSU
| 27 || 0 || 15.9 || .533 || .200 || .550 || 3.3 || .7 || 1.0 || .2 || 4.4
|-
| style="text-align:left;"|2019–20
| style="text-align:left;"|Tulsa
| 30 || 29 || 29.1 || .441 || .246 || .794 || 5.8 || 1.4 || 1.5 || .6 || 12.1
|-
| style="text-align:left;"|2020–21
| style="text-align:left;"|Tulsa
| 23 || 23 || 31.6 || .442 || .314 || .726 || 7.2 || 2.2 || 1.6 || .8 || 15.0
|- class="sortbottom"
| style="text-align:center;" colspan="2"| Career
| 80 || 52 || 25.4 || .454 || .285 || .732 || 5.4 || 1.4 || 1.3 || .5 || 10.4

JUCO

|-
| style="text-align:left;"|2018–19
| style="text-align:left;"|Pearl River CC
| 30 || 28 || – || .497 || .292 || .641 || 8.7 || 2.7 || 1.7 || .8 || 15.5

References

External links
 Tulsa Golden Hurricane bio
 Pearl River CC Wildcats bio
 LSU Tigers bio

1999 births
Living people
American men's basketball players
Basketball players from Louisiana
Junior college men's basketball players in the United States
Long Island Nets players
LSU Tigers basketball players
Natchitoches Central High School alumni
Pearl River Community College alumni
Shooting guards
Sportspeople from Natchitoches, Louisiana
Tulsa Golden Hurricane men's basketball players